CLHS may refer to:

Schools 
 California Lutheran High School, Wildomar, California, United States
 Canyon Lake High School (Texas), Fischer, Texas, United States
 Cardinal Langley Roman Catholic High School, Middleton, Greater Manchester, England
 Center Line High School, Center Line, Michigan, United States
 Central Lafourche High School, Matthews, Louisiana, United States
 Central Lancaster High School, Lancaster, England
 Chung Ling High School, George Town, Panang, Malaysia
 Clear Lake High School (Clear Lake, Iowa), United States
 Clear Lake High School (Houston, Texas), United States
 Concordia Lutheran High School (Fort Wayne, Indiana), United States
 Concordia Lutheran High School (Texas), Tomball, Texas, United States
 County Line High School, Branch, Arkansas, United States
Cold Lake High School, Cold Lake, Alberta, Canada
Crean Lutheran High School, Irvine, California, United States

Other uses 
 Common Lisp HyperSpec